India's 'Connect Central Asia' Policy is a broad-based approach, including political, security, economic and cultural connections. The importance of this policy was strengthened when the Prime Minister of India visited all the five countries Uzbekistan, Kazakhstan, Turkmenistan, Kyrgyzstan and Tajikistan in 2015.

History

2012 elucidation 
On 12 June 2012 India's Minister of State for External Affairs E. Ahamed outlined some of the elements of India's 'Connect Central Asia' policy as follows:

2014–present 
A number of high-level visits have taken place involving heads of states, Presidents and Prime Ministers, foreign, defence and home ministers, in the respective central Asian countries as well as in India. Multilateral dialogues such as the "Central Asia Dialogue" have been conducted. The most recent and third edition was conducted between 18-21 December 2021.

See also 

 Turkmenistan–Afghanistan–Pakistan–India (TAPI) Pipeline

References

Further reading 

Foreign policy doctrines of India
Politics of Central Asia
Foreign relations of Asia